Humbeek is a small town in Belgium with approximately 3,985 inhabitants. It is located in the municipality of Grimbergen, in the province of Flemish Brabant. Humbeek has an area of 7,87 km2 and a population density of 506 inhabitants per km2. Humbeek is located along the Brussels–Scheldt Maritime Canal, which divides the village in two.

History
Humbeek was an independent municipality with its own mayor until 1976. On January 1, 1977, it became a submunicipality of Grimbergen.

References

Populated places in Flemish Brabant